Rare Earth: Why Complex Life Is Uncommon in the Universe is a 2000 popular science book about xenobiology by Peter Ward, a geologist and evolutionary biologist, and Donald E. Brownlee, a cosmologist and astrobiologist. The book is the origin of the term 'Rare Earth Hypothesis' which, like the book's authors, assert that complex life is rare in the universe.

Synopsis

Ward and Brownlee argue that the universe is fundamentally hostile to complex life and that while microbial life may be common in the universe, complex intelligent life (like the evolution of biological complexity from simple life on Earth) required an exceptionally unlikely set of circumstances, and therefore complex life is likely to be extremely rare. They argue that among the essential criteria for life are a terrestrial planet with plate tectonics and oxygen, a large moon, magnetic field, a gas giant like Jupiter for protection and an orbit in the habitable zone of the right kind of star. Additionally, events during the Earth's geological past such as Snowball Earth, the Cambrian Explosion, and the various mass extinction events that nearly destroyed life on Earth arguably make the existence and survival of complex life rare as well. They also suggest that animal life, having taken hundreds of millions of years to evolve, unlike bacteria, which were the first life to appear on Earth, is extremely fragile to sudden and severe changes in the environment, and therefore is very prone to becoming extinct very easily and quickly within a short period of geological time, while microbial life is much more resilient to such changes. 

They also argue that due to the immense size of the universe, even if another habitable planet like Earth does exist elsewhere, and that the Earth is not the only planet in the universe with complex life, such planets would still only appear in relatively small numbers compared to planets that are habitable only to bacteria, and would most likely be too far away for any intelligent lifeforms, if they exist, to make contact with each other as well as with our own planet, as the vast distances between those planets would essentially isolate them, and by the time any signals reach their destination, the planet the signal originated from may no longer be habitable anymore except for at least bacteria, and whatever life that sent said signal may already be extinct, making any form of contact with each other useless. Finally, they warn about the current degradation of the Earth's biosphere due to human activities, suggesting that if humans destroy a significant portion of animal life on Earth, then they would also destroy that same amount of that kind of life in the entire universe.

Reception
Rare Earth attracted substantial attention, both in the media and academically. It has been cited by many subsequent articles in the field of geology and astrobiology. Christopher McKay wrote a positive review titled 'All Alone After All?', in the journal Science. The Times proclaimed it as an answer to the Copernican Principle. Discover described it as a "a wet blanket for E.T. enthusiasts". The book's rationale was also praised by media outlets including Newsday and The Economist. CNN described it as an answer to the Fermi paradox. Several astronomy sources also praised the book including Sky & Telescope and Astronomy magazine. Other science media also praised the book including American Scientist, Popular Mechanics, and Physics Today. Ward & Brownlee's Rare Earth Hypothesis has been further popularised in books along the same theme.

It was not without its critics, however. While initially declaring it a "must read", the geoscientist James Kasting wrote a highly critical reply in the journal Perspectives in Biology and Medicine, challenging its restrictive criteria. Several books were written in reply including Evolving the Alien by Jack Cohen, who described Ward and Brownlee's assumption as restrictive and unimaginative; and a form of circular reasoning. The book Life Everywhere by David Darling was also written largely in reply to Rare Earth and Darling describes it as neither a hypothesis nor prediction, but merely "a description of how life arose on Earth" having selected the factors that best suit the case.

What matters is not whether there's anything unusual about the Earth; there's going to be something idiosyncratic about every planet in space. What matters is whether any of Earth's circumstances are not only unusual but also essential for complex life. So far we've seen nothing to suggest there is.

According to Robert K. Logan there is very little surprise as to why the book received significant interest from the neo-creationism movement. While Ward & Brownlee attribute this exceptional unlikeliness to chance, many within the movement regard this as evidence of an intelligent designer. Many subsequent intelligent design advocates have been inspired by Rare Earth including Guillermo Gonzalez who wrote and the book The Privileged Planet promoting the concept of intelligent design. Gonzalez coined the term Galactic Habitable Zone based on the work 'The Galactic Habitable Zone: Galactic Chemical Evolution', a collaboration with Ward & Brownlee.

Follow-on book 
Rare Earth was eventually succeeded by a follow-on book called  The Life and Death of Planet Earth: How the New Science of Astrobiology Charts the Ultimate Fate of our World, also by Ward and Brownlee, which talks about  the Earth's long term future and eventual demise under a warming and expanding Sun, showing readers the concept that planets like Earth have finite lifespans, and that complex and especially intelligent life is not just rare in space, but also rare in time, and is more likely to die out relatively soon and rather quickly within a short period of time on geological timescales, even more so with the latter, while microbes are expected to survive much longer, and therefore dominate most of the planet's history, and being the first life to appear, will likely also be the last life to ultimately remain and then disappear.

Reviews 

"...likely to cause a revolution in thinking..."

The New York Times

"...[the book] has hit the world of astrobiologists like a killer asteroid..."

Newsday (New York)

"...a sobering and valuable perspective..."

Science

"...a startling new hypothesis..."

Library Journal

"...Peter Ward and Donald Brownlee offer a powerful argument..."

The Economist

"...provocative, significant, and sweeping..."

Northwest Science & Technology

"...a stellar example of clear writing..."

American Scientist

See also
Planetary habitability
Drake Equation

References

 
 
 

2000 non-fiction books
American non-fiction books
Books about extraterrestrial life
Books by Donald E. Brownlee
Books by Peter Ward (paleontologist)
English-language books